Bilaller can refer to:

 Bilaller, Ayvacık
 Bilaller, Çan